Jan van Buijtenen (8 January 1920 – 19 January 1976) was a Dutch footballer. He played in one match for the Netherlands national football team in 1946.

References

External links
 

1920 births
1976 deaths
Dutch footballers
Netherlands international footballers
Place of birth missing
Association football defenders
Hermes DVS players